Lohizun or Lohitzun may refer to

Lohitzun-Oyhercq, a commune of Pyrénées-Atlantiques
Donibane-Lohitzune, Basque name of Saint-Jean-de-Luz